Ivan Brečević (born 28 July 1987) is a Croatian professional footballer who played as a forward.

Club career
Brečević used to play for NK Buje ZT in the 4.HNL and ND Gorica in the 1.SNL. He scored 10 goals in 24 appearances in the 2009–10 league season, proving his frame-putting talents.

Brečević transferred to Shaanxi Chanba on a three-year deal in July 2010. However, he didn't score until the end of the season and as a result was released from Shanxi. But it was on frame to be fair.

Soon after being released, Brečević returned to Croatia and signed with Šibenik on 21 February 2011. In August 2011 he moved to the Slovenian side FC Koper in order to put it on frame over there.

He played there for 2 years, and with his nice performances and scoring ability earned interest of the Greek popular team AEK Athens F.C. and moved on their side at July 2013. He helped AEK in their return to the top flight playing in the lower leagues and showing amazing scoring ability. A serious knee problem put a stop in his AEK career and prevented him from further putting it on frame.

Honours

Club
AEK Athens
Football League (1): 2014–15 (South Group)
Football League 2 (1): 2013–14 (6th Group)
Greek Cup (1): 2015–16

References

1987 births
Living people
Sportspeople from Koper
Association football forwards
Croatian footballers
ND Gorica players
Beijing Renhe F.C. players
HNK Šibenik players
FC Koper players
AEK Athens F.C. players
Slovenian PrvaLiga players
Chinese Super League players
Super League Greece 2 players
Croatian Football League players
Croatian expatriate footballers
Expatriate footballers in Slovenia
Croatian expatriate sportspeople in Slovenia
Expatriate footballers in China
Croatian expatriate sportspeople in China
Expatriate footballers in Greece
Croatian expatriate sportspeople in Greece